Joseph Netherclift (8 September 1792 - 8 April 1863) was an English composer and lithographer. He was awarded a medal in 1829 for his method of lithography. He was making lithographic facsimiles of historical documents in 1833.

Perhaps his most famous work is "We Happy Shepherd Swains".

Netherclift died 8 April 1863 and is buried in Brompton Cemetery, London.

Notes

External links
WorldCat page

1792 births
1863 deaths
English composers
Burials at Brompton Cemetery
English lithographers
19th-century English musicians